Javontee Herndon (born June 29, 1991) is an American football wide receiver who is currently a free agent. He played college football at Arkansas.

High school
Herndon played at Jacksonville Bolles from 2008-2011. He was a part of the back to back state championship teams.

College career
Herndon attended the University of Arkansas from 2010-2013. In 2012, he appeared in every game and finished the season with 21 receptions, 304 yards and two touchdowns.

Professional career

San Diego Chargers
Herndon was signed by the San Diego Chargers after going undrafted in the 2014 NFL Draft. On November 3, 2015, he was added to the active roster after Keenan Allen suffered a kidney injury. On August 30, 2016, he was placed on injured reserve.

Dallas Cowboys
On July 28, 2017, Herndon signed with the Dallas Cowboys. He was waived on August 15, 2017.

Memphis Express
In 2018, Herndon signed with the Memphis Express of the Alliance of American Football for the 2019 season. However, he did not make the final roster.

References

1991 births
Living people
American football wide receivers
Bolles School alumni
Arkansas Razorbacks football players
Dallas Cowboys players
Memphis Express (American football) players
San Diego Chargers players
Players of American football from Jacksonville, Florida